The Romanians (dated exonym Vlachs) are a Romance-speaking ethnic group. Sharing a common Romanian culture and ancestry, and speaking the Romanian language, they live primarily in Romania and Moldova. The 2021 Romanian census found that just under 89.3% of Romania's citizens identified themselves as ethnic Romanians.

In one interpretation of the 1989 census results in Moldova, the majority of Moldovans were counted as ethnic Romanians in this country as well. Romanians also form an ethnic minority in several nearby countries situated in Central, Southeastern, and Eastern Europe, most notably in Hungary, Serbia (including Timok), and Ukraine.

Estimates of the number of Romanian people worldwide vary from minimum 24 to maximum 30 million, in part depending on whether the definition of the term "Romanian" includes natives of both Romania and Moldova, their respective diasporas, and native speakers of both Romanian and other Eastern Romance languages (or Daco-Romance languages). Other speakers of the latter languages are the Aromanians, the Megleno-Romanians, and the Istro-Romanians (native to Istria, Croatia), all of them unevenly distributed throughout the Balkan Peninsula, which may be considered either Romanian subgroups or separated yet related ethnicities.

History

Antiquity 

Inhabited by the ancient Dacians, part of today's territory of Romania was conquered by the Roman Empire in 106, when Trajan's army defeated the army of Dacia's ruler Decebalus (see Dacian Wars). The Roman administration withdrew two centuries later, under the pressure of the Goths and Carpi.

Two theories account for the origin of the Romanian people. One, known as the Daco-Roman continuity theory, posits that they are descendants of Romans and Romanized indigenous peoples living in the Roman Province of Dacia, while the other posits that the Romanians are descendants of Romans and Romanized indigenous populations of the former Roman provinces of Illyricum, Moesia, Thracia, and Macedonia, and the ancestors of Romanians later migrated from these Roman provinces south of the Danube into the area which they inhabit today.

According to the first theory, the Romanians are descended from indigenous populations that inhabited what is now Romania and its immediate environs: Thracians (more specifically the Dacians and Getae) and Roman legionaries and colonists. In the course of the two wars with the Roman legions, in 101 through 102 AD and 105 through 106 AD respectively, the emperor Trajan succeeded in defeating the Dacians and the greatest part of Dacia became a Roman province.

The colonisation with Roman or Romanized elements, the use of the Latin language and the assimilation of Roman civilisation as well as the intense development of urban centres led to the Romanization of part of the autochthonous population in Dacia. This process was probably concluded by the 10th century when the assimilation of the Slavs by the Daco-Romanians was completed.

According to the south-of-the-Danube origin theory, the Romanians' ancestors, a combination of Romans and Romanized peoples of Illyria, Moesia and Thrace, moved northward across the Danube river into modern-day Romania. Small population groups speaking several versions of Romanian (Aromanian, Megleno-Romanian and Istro-Romanian) still exist south of the Danube in Greece, Albania, Macedonia, Bulgaria and Serbia, but it is not known whether they themselves migrated from more northern parts of the Balkans, including Dacia. The south-of-the Danube theory usually favours northern Albania and/or Moesia (modern day Serbia and Northern Bulgaria) as the more specific places of Romanian ethnogenesis.

Small genetic differences were reportedly found among Southeast European (Greece, Albania) populations and especially those of the Dniester–Carpathian (Romania, Moldova, Ukraine) region. Despite this low level of differentiation between them, tree reconstruction and principal component analyses allowed a distinction between Balkan–Carpathian (Romanians, Moldovans, Ukrainians, Macedonians, and Gagauzes) and Balkan Mediterranean (Greeks, Albanians, Turks) population groups. The genetic affinities among Dniester–Carpathian and southeastern European populations do not reflect their linguistic relationships. According to the report, the results indicate that the ethnic and genetic differentiations occurred in these regions to a considerable extent independently of each other.

Encyclopædia Britannica claims that "from the arrival of the Huns in the 5th century until the emergence of the principalities of Wallachia and Moldavia in the 14th century, the Romanian people virtually disappeared from written history".

Middle Ages to Early Modern Age 

During the Middle Ages Romanians were mostly known as Vlachs, a blanket term ultimately of Germanic origin, from the word Walha, used by ancient Germanic peoples to refer to Romance-speaking and Celtic neighbours. Besides the separation of some groups (Aromanians, Megleno-Romanians, and Istro-Romanians) during the Age of Migration, many Vlachs could be found all over the Balkans, in Transylvania, across Carpathian Mountains as far north as Poland and as far west as the regions of Moravia (part of the modern Czech Republic), some went as far east as Volhynia of western Ukraine, and the present-day Croatia where the Morlachs gradually disappeared, while the Catholic and Orthodox Vlachs took Croat and Serb national identity.

The first written record about a Romance language spoken in the Middle Ages in the Balkans is from 587 AD. A Vlach muleteer accompanying the Byzantine army noticed that the load was falling from one of the animals and shouted to a companion Torna, torna, fratre! (meaning "Return, return, brother!"). Theophanes Confessor recorded it as part of a 6th-century military expedition by Comentiolus and Priscus against the Avars and Slovenes.

Historian Gheorghe I. Brătianu considers that these words "represent an expression from the Romanian language, as it was formed at that time in the Balkan and Danube regions"; "they probably belong to one and the most significant of the substrates on which our (Romanian) language was built". At the same time, he rejects the theory of military command, as it would have been impossible for there to be addresses with the too familiar term "brother" in the army.

A series of Byzantine writers and chroniclers, such as Anna Komnene (1083-1153), John Kinnamos (1143-1185) and Niketas Choniates (1155-1217) highlight the fighting qualities of the Vlachs. For example, the princess and chronicler Anna Komnene  reports that in April 1091, on the eve of the decisive Byzantine-Pecheneg Battle of Levounion, Emperor Alexios I Komnenos (1057-1118) was assisted by "a number of 5,000 brave mountaineers and ready to attack, passed by his side, to fight alongside him". Most of the specialists who have addressed these aspects have identified those " bold mountaineers ", with the Vlachs.  Anna Komnene reports that in 1094, on the occasion of the Cumans' campaign south of the Danube, Emperor Alexios I Komnenos was informed about the movements of the "Turanians", who had crossed the Danube by "a certain Pudilos, a Vlach noble".

The event during which the Vlachs proved their loyalty to the emperor Manuel I Komnenos took place in 1164, when Andronikos I Komnenos, the emperor's cousin, tried without success, to usurp the throne. Failing in his attempt, the Byzantine prince sought refuge in Halych, but the Byzantine chronicler Niketas Choniates reports that Andronikos I Komnenos was "captured by the Vlachs, to whom the rumor of his escape had reached, he was taken back to the emperor".

The relentless fighting qualities of the Vlachs are also indirectly asserted by other Byzantine chroniclers. Thus, the Byzantine chronicler John Kinnamos, presenting the campaign of Manuel I Komnenos  against Hungary in 1166, reports that General Leon Vatatzes had under his command " a great multitude of Vlachs, who are said to be ancient colonies of those in Italy ", an army that attacked the Hungarian possessions " about the lands near the Pontus called the Euxine ", respectively the southeastern regions of Transylvania , " destroyed everything without sparing and trampled everything it encountered in its passage ".

Because of the migrations that followed – such as those of Slavs, Bulgars, Hungarians, Pecheneg, Cumans and Tatars – the Romanians were organised in agricultural communes (obști), developing large centralised states only in the 14th century, when the Danubian Principalities of Moldavia and Wallachia emerged to fight the Ottoman Empire.

During the Middle Ages the Bulgarian Empire controlled vast areas to the north of the river Danube (with interruptions) from its establishment in 681 to its fragmentation in 1371–1422. These lands were called by contemporary Byzantine historians Bulgaria across the Danube, or Transdanubian Bulgaria. Original information for the centuries-old Bulgarian rule there is scarce as the archives of the Bulgarian rulers were destroyed and little is mentioned for this area in Byzantine or Hungarian manuscripts. During the First Bulgarian Empire, the Dridu culture developed in the beginning of the 8th century and flourished until the 11th century. It represents an early medieval archaeological culture which emerged in the region of the Lower Danube. In Bulgaria it is usually referred to as Pliska-Preslav culture.

During the late Middle Ages, prominent medieval Romanian monarchs such as Bogdan of Moldavia, Stephen the Great, Mircea the Elder, Michael the Brave, or Vlad the Impaler took part actively in the history of Central Europe by waging tumultuous wars and leading noteworthy crusades against the then continuously expanding Ottoman Empire, at times allied with either the Kingdom of Poland or the Kingdom of Hungary in these causes.

Eventually the entire Balkan peninsula was annexed by the Ottoman Empire. However, Moldavia and Wallachia (extending to Dobruja and Bulgaria) were not entirely subdued by the Ottomans as both principalities became autonomous (which was not the case of other Ottoman territorial possessions in Europe). Transylvania, a third region inhabited by an important majority of Romanian speakers, was a vassal state of the Ottomans until 1687, when the principality became part of the Habsburg possessions. The three principalities were united for several months in 1600 under the authority of Wallachian Prince Michael the Brave.

Additionally, in medieval times there were other lands known by the name 'Vlach' (such as Great Vlachia, situated between Thessaly and the western Pindus mountains, originally within the Byzantine Empire, but after the 13th century autonomous or semi-independent; White Wallachia, a Byzantine denomination for the region between the Danube River and the Balkans; Moravian Wallachia, a region in south-eastern Czech Republic).

Up until 1541, Transylvania was part of the Kingdom of Hungary, later (due to the conquest of Hungary by the Ottoman Empire) was a self-governed Principality governed by the Hungarian nobility. In 1699 it became a part of the Habsburg lands. By the end of the 18th century, the Austrian Empire was awarded by the Ottomans with the region of Bukovina and, in 1812, the Russians occupied the eastern half of Moldavia, known as Bessarabia through the Treaty of Bucharest of 1812.

Late Modern Age to Contemporary Era 

In the context of the 1848 Romanticist and liberal revolutions across Europe, the events that took place in the Grand Principality of Transylvania were the first of their kind to unfold in the Romanian-speaking territories. On the one hand, the Transylvanian Saxons and the Transylvanian Romanians (with consistent support on behalf of the Austrian Empire) successfully managed to oppose the goals of the Hungarian Revolution of 1848, with the two noteworthy historical figures leading the common Romanian-Saxon side at the time being Avram Iancu and Stephan Ludwig Roth.

On the other hand, the Wallachian revolutions of 1821 and 1848 as well as the Moldavian Revolution of 1848, which aimed for independence from Ottoman and Russian foreign rulership, represented important impacts in the process of spreading the liberal ideology in the eastern and southern Romanian lands, in spite of the fact that all three eventually failed. Nonetheless, in 1859, Moldavia and Wallachia elected the same ruler, namely Alexander John Cuza (who reigned as Domnitor) and were thus unified de facto, resulting in the United Romanian Principalities for the period between 1859 and 1881.

During the 1870s, the United Romanian Principalities (then led by Hohenzollern-Sigmaringen Domnitor Carol I) fought a War of Independence against the Ottomans, with Romania's independence being formally recognised in 1878 at the Treaty of Berlin. Although the newly founded Kingdom of Romania initially allied with Austria-Hungary, Romania refused to enter World War I on the side of the Central Powers, because it was obliged to wage war only if Austria-Hungary was attacked. In 1916, Romania joined the war on the side of the Triple Entente.

As a result, at the end of the war, Transylvania, Bessarabia, and Bukovina were awarded to Romania, through a series of international peace treaties, resulting in an enlarged and far more powerful kingdom under King Ferdinand I. As of 1920, the Romanian people was believed to number over 15 million solely in the region of the Romanian kingdom, a figure larger than the populations of Sweden, Denmark, and the Netherlands combined.

During the interwar period, two additional monarchs came to the Romanian throne, namely Carol II and Michael I. This short-lived period was marked, at times, by political instabilities and efforts of maintaining a constitutional monarchy in favour of other, totalitarian regimes such as an absolute monarchy or a military dictatorship.

During World War II, the Kingdom of Romania lost territory both to the east and west, as Northern Transylvania became part of Hungary through the Second Vienna Award, while Bessarabia and northern Bukovina were taken by the Soviets and included in the Moldavian SSR, respectively Ukrainian SSR. The eastern territory losses were facilitated by the Molotov-Ribbentrop Nazi-Soviet non-aggression pact.

After the end of the war, the Romanian Kingdom managed to regain territories lost westward but was nonetheless not given Bessarabia and northern Bukovina, the aforementioned regions being forcefully incorporated into the Soviet Union. Subsequently, the Soviet Union imposed a Communist government and King Michael was forced to abdicate and leave for exile. Nicolae Ceaușescu became the head of the Romanian Communist Party in 1965 and his severe rule of the 1980s was ended by the Romanian Revolution of 1989.

The mayhem and chaos of the 1989 revolution brought to power the dissident communist Ion Iliescu (largely supported by the FSN). He remained in power as head of state until 1996, when he was defeated by CDR-supported Emil Constantinescu at the 1996 general elections, the first in post-communist Romania that saw a peaceful transition of power. Following Constantinescu's single term as president from 1996 to 2000, Iliescu was re-elected in late 2000 for another term of four years. In 2004, Traian Băsescu, the PNL-PD candidate, was elected president. Five years later, Băsescu (solely supported by the PDL this time) was narrowly re-elected for a second term at the 2009 presidential elections.

In 2014, the PNL-PDL candidate (as part of the larger Christian Liberal Alliance or ACL for short; also backed by the Democratic Forum of Germans in Romania, FDGR/DFDR for short respectively) Klaus Iohannis won a surprise victory over former Prime Minister and PSD-supported contender Victor Ponta in the second round of the 2014 presidential elections. Thus, Iohannis became the first Romanian president stemming from an ethnic minority of the country (as he belongs to the Romanian-German community, being a Transylvanian Saxon). In 2019, the PNL-supported Iohannis was re-elected for a second term as president after a second round landslide victory at the 2019 Romanian presidential election (being also supported in that round by PMP and USR as well as by the FDGR/DFDR in both rounds).

In the meantime, Romania's major foreign policy achievements were the alignment with Western Europe and the United States by joining the North Atlantic Treaty Organization (NATO) back in 2004 and the European Union three years later, in 2007. Current national objectives of Romania include adhering to the Schengen Area, the Eurozone as well as the OECD (i.e. Organisation for Economic Co-operation and Development).

Historiography
Modern Romanian historiography blends European historical traditions of imperialism with Christianity, mostly emphasizing the Europeaness of Romanians in the mythology of their ethnogenesis (and de-emphasizing the collective histories of the Ottoman past). This is similar to the role of Hellenism in Greek historiography, although it begins about one century earlier than Hellenism. Since the 17th century, the Latin origins of the Romanian people have been central in Romanian historiography, to an extent described as "a constant, and even obsessive, preoccupation". The roots of this Latin historical tradition lie with Trajan's Dacian Wars, which either annihilated or fully assilimiated the indigenous Dacians that lived in modern Romania.

Language 

The origins of the Romanian language, a Romance language, can be traced back to the Roman colonisation of the region. The basic vocabulary is of Latin origin, although there are some substratum words that are sometimes assumed to be of Dacian origin.

During the Middle Ages, Romanian was isolated from the other Romance languages, and borrowed words from the nearby Slavic languages (see Slavic influence on Romanian). Later on, it borrowed a number of words from German, Hungarian, and Turkish. During the modern era, most neologisms were borrowed from French and Italian, though the language has increasingly begun to adopt English borrowings.

The Moldovan language, in its official form, is practically identical to Romanian, although there are some differences in colloquial speech. In the de facto independent (but internationally unrecognised) region of Transnistria, the official script used to write Moldovan is Cyrillic.

Since 2013, the Romanian Language Day is celebrated on 31 August in Romania. A similar holiday also exists in Moldova on the same day since 1990. It is known as "Limba noastră".

As of 2017, an Ethnologue estimation puts the (worldwide) number of Romanian speakers at approximately 24.15 million. The 24.15 million, however, represent only speakers of Romanian, not all of whom are necessarily ethnic Romanians. Also, this number does not include ethnic-Romanians who no longer speak the Romanian language.

Surnames 
Many Romanian surnames have the suffix -escu or (less commonly) -așcu or -ăscu which corresponds to the Latin suffix -iscus and means "belonging to the people". For example, Petrescu used to be Petre's kin. Similar suffixes such as -asco, -asgo, -esque, -ez, etc. are present in other Latin-derived languages. Many Romanians in France changed this ending of their surnames to -esco, because the way it is pronounced in French better approximates the Romanian pronunciation of -escu.

Another widespread suffix of Romanian surnames is -eanu (or -an, -anu), which indicates the geographical origin. Some examples are: Moldoveanu/Moldovan/Moldovanu, from the region of Moldavia or from river Moldova, Munteanu 'from mountains', Jianu 'from Jiu river region', Pruteanu, meaning 'from the Prut river', Mureșanu, meaning 'from the Mureș river', and Petreanu (meaning 'the son of Petre').

Other suffixes are -aru (or -oru, -ar, -or), which indicates an occupation (like Feraru (meaning 'smith' or Morar meaning 'miller'), and -ei, usually preceded by A- in front of a female name, which is a Latin inherited female genitive, like in Amariei (meaning of Maria), Aelenei (meaning of Elena). These matrilineal-rooted surnames are common in the historical region of Moldavia.

The most common surnames are Pop/Popa ('the priest')—almost 200,000 Romanians have this surname
—Popescu ('son of the priest') —almost 150,000 have this name
— and Ionescu ('John's (Ion's) son').

Names for Romanians 
In English, Romanians are usually called Romanians and very rarely Rumanians or Roumanians, except in some historical texts, where they are called Roumans or Vlachs.

Etymology of the name Romanian 

The name Romanian is derived from Latin romanus, meaning "Roman". Under regular phonetical changes that are typical to the Romanian language, the name  over the centuries transformed into  . Socio-linguistic evolutions in the late 18th century led to a gradual preponderance of the  spelling form, which was then generalised during the National awakening of Romania of early 19th century. Until the 19th century, the term Romanian denoted the speakers of the Daco-Romanian dialect of the Romanian language, thus being a much more distinct concept than that of Romania, the country of the Romanians. Prior to 1859, the Romanians were part of different state entities, with the Moldavians and the Wallachians being split off and having shaped separate political identities, possessing states of their own, while the rest of the Romanians were part of other states. However, eventually they retained their Romanian cultural and ethnic identity up to today. Some authors argue that the Romanians, with the exception of the Rhaeto-Romance-speaking peoples, are the only ones that have designated themselves as "Romans" since the fall of the Roman Empire.

Several historical sources show the use of the term "Romanian" among the medieval or early modern Romanian population. One of the earliest examples comes from the Nibelungenlied, a German epic poem from before 1200 in which a "Duke Ramunc from the land of Vlachs (Wallachia)" is mentioned. "Vlach" was an exonym used almost exclusively for the Romanians during the Middle Ages. It has been argued by some Romanian researchers that "Ramunc" was not the name of the duke, but a name that highlighted his ethnicity. Other old documents, especially Byzantine or Hungarian ones, make a correlation between the old Romanians as Romans or their descendants. Several other documents, notably from Italian travelers into Wallachia, Moldavia and Transylvania, speak of the self-identification, language and culture of the Romanians, showing that they designated themselves as "Romans" or related to them in up to 30 works. One example is Tranquillo Andronico's 1534 writing that states that the Vlachs "now call themselves Romans". Another one is Francesco della Valle's 1532 manuscripts that state that the Romanians from Wallachia, Moldavia and Transylvania preserved the name "Roman" and cites the sentence "Sti Rominest?" (?, "do you speak Romanian?"). Authors that travelled to modern Romania who wrote about it in 1574, 1575 and 1666 also noted the use of the term "Romanian". From the Middle Ages, Romanians bore two names, the exonym (one given to them by foreigners) Wallachians or Vlachs, under its various forms (vlah, valah, valach, voloh, blac, olăh, vlas, ilac, ulah, etc.), and the endonym (the name they used for themselves) Romanians (/).

Other researchers have expressed a different point of view and have doubted or denied the continuity of the ethonym "Romanian" from "Roman", at least on an ethnic sense. For example, Onoriu Colăcel considers that the terms "Romania" and "Romanian" would only have appeared during the 19th century. According to Vladimír Baar and Daniel Jakubek, typically pro-Russian authors in Moldova tend to argue that "Romanian" as an ethnonym is only a mere recent product from Romanian nationalist historical myths despite the attestation of this name in old documents. Examples of this would include Petr Shornikov, Mikhail Guboglo and Valentin Dergachev. According to Tomasz Kamusella, at the time of the rise of Romanian nationalism during the early 19th century, the political leaders of Wallachia and Moldavia were aware that the name România was identical to Romania, a name that had been used for the former Byzantine Empire by its inhabitants. Kamusella continues by stating that they preferred this ethnonym in order to stress their presumed link with Ancient Rome and that it became more popular as a nationalistic form of referring to all Romanian-language speakers as a distinct and separate nation during the 1820s. Raymond Detrez asserts that , derived from the Latin , acquired at a certain point the same meaning of the Greek ; that of Orthodox Christian. Wolfgang Dahmen claims that the meaning of romanus (Roman) as "Christian", as opposed to "pagan", which used to mean "non-Roman", may have contributed to the preservation of this word as an ethonym of the Romanian people, under the meaning of "Christian".

Daco-Romanian 

To distinguish Romanians from the other Romanic peoples of the Balkans (Aromanians, Megleno-Romanians, and Istro-Romanians), the term Daco-Romanian is sometimes used to refer to those who speak the standard Romanian language and live in the former territory of ancient Dacia (today comprising mostly Romania and Moldova) and its surroundings (such as Dobruja or the Timok Valley, the latter region part of the former Roman province of Dacia Ripensis).

Etymology of the term Vlach 

The name of "Vlachs" is an exonym that was used by Slavs to refer to all Romanized natives of the Balkans. It holds its origin from ancient Germanic—being a cognate to "Welsh" and "Walloon"—and perhaps even further back in time, from the Roman name Volcae, which was originally a Celtic tribe. From the Slavs, it was passed on to other peoples, such as the Hungarians (Oláh) and Greeks (Vlachoi) (see the Etymology section of Vlachs). Wallachia, the Southern region of Romania, takes its name from the same source.

Nowadays, the term Vlach is more often used to refer to the Romanized populations of the Balkans who speak Daco-Romanian, Aromanian, Istro-Romanian, and Megleno-Romanian.

Anthroponyms 

These are family names that have been derived from either Vlach or Romanian. These names denote a Romanian-speaker or an ethnic Romanian in the languages of the respective peoples using them. Examples: Oláh (37,147 Hungarians have this name), Vlach, Vlahuta, Vlasa, Vlasi, Vlašic, Vlasceanu, Vlachopoulos, Voloh, Volyh, Vlack, Flack, and Vlax.

Romanians outside Romania 

Most Romanians live in Romania, where they constitute a majority; Romanians also constitute a minority in the countries that neighbour Romania. Romanians can also be found in many countries, notably in the other EU countries, particularly in Italy, Spain, Germany, the United Kingdom and France; in North America in the United States and Canada; in Israel; as well as in Brazil, Australia, Argentina, and New Zealand among many other countries. Italy and Spain have been popular emigration destinations, due to a relatively low language barrier, and both are each now home to about a million Romanians. With respect to geopolitical identity, many individuals of Romanian ethnicity in Moldova prefer to identify themselves as Moldovans.

The contemporary total population of ethnic Romanians cannot be stated with any degree of certainty. A disparity can be observed between official sources (such as census counts) where they exist, and estimates which come from non-official sources and interested groups. Several inhibiting factors (not unique to this particular case) contribute towards this uncertainty, which may include:

A degree of overlap may exist or be shared between Romanian and other ethnic identities in certain situations, and census or survey respondents may elect to identify with one particular ancestry but not another, or instead identify with multiple ancestries;
Counts and estimates may inconsistently distinguish between Romanian nationality and Romanian ethnicity (i.e. not all Romanian nationals identify with Romanian ethnicity, and vice versa);
The measurements and methodologies employed by governments to enumerate and describe the ethnicity and ancestry of their citizens vary from country to country. Thus the census definition of "Romanian" might variously mean Romanian-born, of Romanian parentage, or also include other ethnic identities as Romanian which otherwise are identified separately in other contexts;

For example, the decennial US Census of 2000 calculated (based on a statistical sampling of household data) that there were 367,310 respondents indicating Romanian ancestry (roughly 0.1% of the total population).

The actual total recorded number of foreign-born Romanians was only 136,000. However, some non-specialist organisations have produced estimates which are considerably higher: a 2002 study by the Romanian-American Network Inc. mentions an estimated figure of 1,200,000 for the number of Romanian-Americans. Which makes the United States home to the largest Romanian community outside Romania.

This estimate notes however that "...other immigrants of Romanian national minority groups have been included such as: Armenians, Germans, Gypsies, Hungarians, Jews, and Ukrainians". It also includes an unspecified allowance for second- and third-generation Romanians, and an indeterminate number living in Canada. An error range for the estimate is not provided. For the United States 2000 Census figures, almost 20% of the total population did not classify or report an ancestry, and the census is also subject to undercounting, an incomplete (67%) response rate, and sampling error in general.

Culture

Contributions to contemporary culture 

Romanians have played and contributed a major role in the advancement of the arts, culture, sciences, technology and engineering.

In the history of aviation, Traian Vuia and Aurel Vlaicu built and tested some of the earliest aircraft designs, while Henri Coandă discovered the Coandă effect of fluidics. Victor Babeș discovered more than 50 germs and a cure for a disease named after him, babesiosis; biologist Nicolae Paulescu was among the first scientists to identify insulin. Another biologist, Emil Palade, received the Nobel Prize for his contributions to cell biology. George Constantinescu created the theory of sonics, while mathematician Ștefan Odobleja has been claimed as "the ideological father behind cybernetics" – his work The Consonantist Psychology (Paris, 1938) was supposedly the main source of inspiration for N. Wiener's Cybernetics (Paris, 1948). Lazăr Edeleanu was the first chemist to synthesize amphetamine and also invented the modern method of refining crude oil.

In the arts and culture, prominent figures were George Enescu (music composer, violinist, professor of Sir Yehudi Menuhin), Constantin Brâncuși (sculptor), Eugène Ionesco (playwright), Mircea Eliade (historian of religion and novelist), Emil Cioran (essayist, Prix de l'Institut Français for stylism) and Angela Gheorghiu (soprano). More recently, filmmakers such as Cristi Puiu and Cristian Mungiu have attracted international acclaim, as has fashion designer Ioana Ciolacu.

In sports, Romanians have excelled in a variety of fields, such as football (Gheorghe Hagi), gymnastics (Nadia Comăneci, Lavinia Miloșovici etc.), tennis (Ilie Năstase, Ion Țiriac, Simona Halep), rowing (Ivan Patzaichin) and handball (four times men's World Cup winners).
Count Dracula is a worldwide icon of Romania. This character was created by the Irish fiction writer Bram Stoker, based on some stories spread in the late Middle Ages by the frustrated German tradesmen of Kronstadt (Brașov) and on some vampire folk tales about the historic Romanian figure of Prince Vlad Țepeș.

Religion 

Almost 90% of all Romanians consider themselves religious. The vast majority are Eastern Orthodox Christians, belonging to the Romanian Orthodox Church (a branch of Eastern Orthodoxy, or Eastern Orthodox Church, together with the Greek Orthodox, Orthodox Church of Georgia and Russian Orthodox Churches, among others). Romanians form the third largest ethno-linguistic group among Eastern Orthodox in the world.

According to the 2011 census, 93.6% of ethnic Romanians in Romania identified themselves as Romanian Orthodox (in comparison to 81% of Romania's total population, including other ethnic groups). However, the actual rate of church attendance is significantly lower and many Romanians are only nominally believers. For example, according to a 2006 Eurobarometer poll, only 23% of Romanians attend church once a week or more. A 2006 poll conducted by the Open Society Foundations found that only 33% of Romanians attended church once a month or more.

Romanian Catholics are present in Transylvania, Banat, Bukovina, Bucharest, and parts of Moldavia, belonging to both the Roman Catholic Church (297,246 members) and the Romanian Greek-Catholic Catholic Church (124,563 members). According to the 2011 census, 2.5% of ethnic Romanians in Romania identified themselves as Catholic (in comparison to 5% of Romania's total population, including other ethnic groups). Around 1.6% of ethnic Romanians in Romania identify themselves as Pentecostal, with the population numbering 276,678 members. Smaller percentages are Protestant, Jews, Muslims, agnostic, atheist, or practice a traditional religion.

There are no official dates for the adoption of religions by the Romanians. Based on linguistic and archaeological findings, historians suggest that the Romanians' ancestors acquired polytheistic religions in the Roman era, later adopting Christianity, certainly by the 4th century CE when decreed by Emperor Constantine as the official religion of the Roman Empire. Like in all other Romance languages, the basic Romanian words related to Christianity are inherited from Latin, such as God (Dumnezeu < ), church ( < ), cross ( < , -), angel ( < ), saint (regional:  < ), Christmas ( < , -), Christian ( < ), Easter ( < ), sin ( < ), to baptise ( < ), priest ( < ), to pray ( < ), faith ( < ), and so on.

After the Great Schism, there existed a Catholic Bishopric of Cumania (later, separate bishoprics in both Wallachia and Moldavia). However, this seems to be the exception, rather than the rule, as in both Wallachia and Moldavia the state religion was Eastern Orthodox. Until the 17th century, the official language of the liturgy was Old Church Slavonic. Then, it gradually changed to Romanian.

According to a survey that took place in 2011, despite 94% of respondents answered positively for believing in God, 42% support the vision of Christian dogma that there is a God incarnated into a human being. While 34% of respondents said that there is only one true religion, 38% believe that there is one true religion and that other religions contain some basic truths, according to 18% there is one true religion and all major world religions contain some fundamental truths. 88% of Romanians believe in the existence of a soul, 87% believe in sin and the existence of heaven, 60% believe in an "evil eye", 25% believe in horoscopes and 23% in aliens. According to a 2004 survey, 80% consider themselves not superstitious and the same amount believe in angels, about 40% believe they have had dreams that became deja vu and 19% believe in ghosts.

Symbols 

In addition to the colours of the Romanian flag, each historical province of Romania has its own characteristic symbol:
 Banat: Trajan's Bridge
 Dobruja: Dolphin
 Moldavia (including Bukovina and Bessarabia): Aurochs/Wisent
 Oltenia: Lion
 Transylvania (including Crișana and Maramureș): Black eagle or Turul
 Wallachia: Eagle
The coat of arms of Romania combines these together.

Customs

Relationship to other ethnic groups 
The closest ethnic groups to the Romanians are the other Romanic peoples of Southeastern Europe: the Aromanians (Macedo-Romanians), the Megleno-Romanians, and the Istro-Romanians. The Istro-Romanians are the closest ethnic group to the Romanians, and it is believed they left Maramureș, Transylvania about a thousand years ago and settled in Istria, Croatia. Numbering about 500 people still living in the original villages of Istria while the majority left for other countries after World War II (mainly to Italy, United States, Canada, Spain, Germany, France, Sweden, Switzerland, Romania, and Australia), they speak the Istro-Romanian language, the closest living relative of Romanian. On the other hand, the Aromanians and the Megleno-Romanians are Romance peoples who live south of the Danube, mainly in Greece, Albania, North Macedonia and Bulgaria although some of them migrated to Romania in the 20th century. It is believed that they diverged from the Romanians in the 7th to 9th century, and currently speak the Aromanian language and Megleno-Romanian language, both of which are Balkan Romance languages, like Romanian, and are sometimes considered by traditional Romanian linguists to be dialects of Romanian.

Genetics 

According to a triple analysis – autosomal, mitochondrial and paternal — of available data from large-scale studies, the whole genome SNP data situates Romanians are most closely related to Bulgarians, Macedonians and, to some extent, Greeks, followed by other European populations, which form a coherent cluster among worldwide populations.

The prevailing Y-chromosome in Wallachia (Ploiești, Dolj), Moldavia (Piatra Neamț, Buhuși), Dobruja (Constanța), and northern Republic of Moldova is recorded to be Haplogroup I. On the basis of 361 samples, Haplogroup I occurs at 32% in Romanians. The frequency of I2a1 (I-P37) in the Balkans today is owed to indigenous European hunter-gatherers tribes, and was present before the Slavic expansion.

According to an Y-chromosome analysis of 335 sampled Romanians, 15% of them belong to R1a. Haplogroup R1a among Romanians is entirely from the Eastern European variety Z282 and may be a result of Baltic, Thracian or Slavic descent. R1a-Z280 outnumbers R1a-M458 among Romanians, the opposite phenomena is typical for Poles, Czechs and Bulgarians. 12% of the Romanians belong to R1b, the Alpino-Italic branch R1b-U152 is at 2% per 330 samples, a lower frequency recorded than other Balkan peoples. The branches R1b-U106, R1b-DF27 and R1b-L21 make up 1% respectively. The eastern branches R1b-M269* and L23* (Z2103) make up 7% and outnumber the Atlantic branches, they prevail in parts of east, central Europe and as a result of Greek colonisation – in parts of Sicily as well. 8% of the Romanians belong to E1b1b1a1 (E-M78) per 265 samples. Other studies analyzing the haplogroup frequency among Romanians came to similar results.

Showing the importance of geography, a 2017 paper concentrated on the mtDNA, and showed how Romania has been "a major crossroads between Asia and Europe" and thus "experienced continuous migration and invasion episodes"; while stating that "previous studies" show Romanians "exhibit genetic similarity with other Europeans" and "another study pointed to possible segregation within the Middle East populations". The paper also mentions how "signals of Asian maternal lineages were observed in all Romanian historical provinces, indicating gene flow along the migration routes through East Asia and Europe, during different time periods, namely, the Upper Paleolithic period and/or, with a likely greater preponderance, the Middle Ages", at low frequency (2.24%). It concludes that "our current findings based on the mtDNA analysis of populations in historical provinces of Romania suggest similarity between populations in Transylvania and Central Europe," on one hand, and between Wallachia, Moldavia, and Dobruja and the Balkans on the other, "supported both by the observed clines in haplogroup frequencies for several European and Asian maternal lineages and MDS analyses."

According to an autosomal DNA analysis of various eastern Europeans and adjacent populations, the Romanians are most closely related to Bulgarians and Macedonians. Most West Slavs, Hungarians, and Austrians were found to share as many identical by-descent segments with South Slavs as with Romanians, Torbeshi and Gagauzes. While Romanians display close relationship to surrounding European populations, they display some substructure in respect to geographic patterns. Romanians display a slightly higher affinity for Anatolian and Middle Eastern populations, compared to other Eastern Europeans.

Gallery

See also 

 List of notable Romanians
 Romance languages
 Slavic influence on Romanian
 Legacy of the Roman Empire
 Romanian diaspora
 Romanians in Germany
 Romanian British
 Romanian French
 Romanian Australians
 Romanian Americans
 Romanian Canadians
 Romanians of Serbia
 Romanian language in Serbia
 Romanians of Ukraine
 Romanians of Hungary
 Romanians of Bulgaria
 History of Romania
 Origin of the Romanians
 Thraco-Roman
 Daco-Roman
 Brodnici
 Morlachs
 Gorals
 Moravian Wallachia
 Culture of Romania
 Art of Romania
 Geography of Romania
 Folklore of Romania
 Music of Romania
 Sport in Romania
 Name of Romania
 Romanian cuisine
 Romanian literature
 Minorities of Romania

Notes and references

External links 

A Concise History of Romanians
The Romanian nation in the beginning of the 20th century

 
Ethnic groups in Romania
Ethnic groups in Moldova
Ethnic groups in Ukraine
Indigenous peoples of Ukraine
Ethnic groups in Serbia
Ethnic groups in Vojvodina
Ethnic groups in Russia
Ethnic groups in Hungary
Eastern Romance people
Romance peoples
Ethnic groups divided by international borders